Chesapeake Senior High School (CHS) is one of two high schools in Maryland by that name. The other is the Chesapeake High School of Baltimore County. It is one of two public high schools in Pasadena, the other being Northeast High School, Chesapeake's rival school. Chesapeake opened in 1976 due to overcrowding at Northeast. It serves students in grades 9–12. The school serves the local feeder system, encompassing Chesapeake Bay Middle School and the respective five elementary schools that feed into it. The school has two floors and includes a football field, several soccer and other athletic fields, and a variety of gymnasiums, including a smaller dance studio.

Students
 
Chesapeake High School's attendance area is identical to Chesapeake Bay Middle School's attendance area. Chesapeake Bay Middle's feeder elementary schools are Lake Shore, Pasadena, Bodkin, and Fort Smallwood. In addition to including the entire Lake Shore region of Pasadena, Chesapeake's attendance area also covers Gibson Island and the Riverdale neighborhood within Severna Park. During the 2019–2020 school year, the racial make-up of Chesapeake High School's 1,388 students was 83.6% white, 5.9% Hispanic,  4.1% Black or African American, 1.9% Asian, and 3.9% two or more races. 14% of students qualified free and reduced meals.

History
In October 2007, Chesapeake High School was listed as one of four high schools in Anne Arundel County that had outbreaks of staph infections. Twenty-eight cases of the infection have also been reported at Severna Park High School, Glen Burnie High School, and Old Mill High School.

In February 2008, Chesapeake parents began an organization (CEEDSS) to protest a special education program, known as CRP or the Chesapeake Regional Program, that has been in the school since 1990, but according to parents has been disruptive to education and concealed by administration.

Academic programs
The school has an Advanced Placement (AP) program that includes Statistics, Calculus, Environmental Science, Chemistry, Biology, Physics, Psychology, United States History, World History, European History, United States Government & Politics, English Language & Composition, English Literature & Composition, Music Theory, Art, Computer Science, and many more. 
Chesapeake High School operates in cooperation with the Center of Applied Technology North to provide career training.
Chesapeake is the home of the ED Regional program, the special education center for northern Anne Arundel County including Intensity-V, Inclusion-V, and the Hannah More Program.

Athletics
Sports teams at Chesapeake, with both varsity and junior varsity teams, are all part of the Maryland Public Secondary Schools Athletic Association. They include:

Baseball
Men's basketball
Women's basketball
Cheerleading
Cross country
Field hockey
Football
Golf
Indoor track and field
Men's lacrosse
Women's lacrosse
Softball
Swimming
Men's soccer
Women's soccer
Tennis
Track and field
Volleyball
Wrestling

Chesapeake has won several state championships including two baseball ('97 and 2014), seven softball ('88, '90, '91, '92, '93, 2007 and 2008), three wrestling ('81, 2000, and 2002), one marching band (2019) and one soccer championship ('98).

Notable alumni
Frederick H. Bealefeld III, former Police Commissioner of the Baltimore Police Department.
Brandi Burkhardt, actress
Lauren Gibson, softball player for the United States women's national softball team 
Nic Kipke, current District 31 representative to the Maryland House of Delegates. 
Victoria L. Schade, former member of Maryland House of Delegates

References

External links
 Official website

Pasadena, Maryland
Public high schools in Maryland
Schools in Anne Arundel County, Maryland
Educational institutions established in 1976
1976 establishments in Maryland